All of Me – Live in Concert is a 2002 live album by American country singer Willie Nelson.

Track listing
Help Me Make It Through the Night - 3:34
Blue Skies - 3:11
Georgia on My Mind - 3:08
Me and Paul - 2:35
City of New Orleans - 2:43
Please Don't Talk About Me When I'm Gone - 2:13
Funny How Time Slips Away - 3:12
Always on My Mind - 3:27
All of Me - 2:15
I Never Cared for You - 4:11
Walkin' the Floor Over You - 1:50
Stardust - 3:24

Personnel
Willie Nelson - Vocals, Guitar
Billy Gene English - Percussion
Paul English - Drums
Jackie King - Guitar
Bobbie Nelson - Piano
Jody Payne - Guitar
Mickey Raphael - Harmonica
Bee Spears - Bass

2002 live albums
Willie Nelson live albums